A tank is an obsolete unit of mass in India approximately equal to 4.4 g (69 gr). After metrication in the mid-20th century, the unit became obsolete.

In Mumbai (formerly Bombay), the tank equalled 17 1/72 grains (about 1.1 grams), and 72 tanks equalled 30 pice. In the 16th century, the tank was reported to be 20.96 g (323.46 grain).

See also
List of customary units of measurement in South Asia

References

Units of mass
Customary units in India
Obsolete units of measurement